Ahmad Darwich (in Arabic أحمد درويش) (born in Lebanon on 15 May 1977) also known as Darwich, is a Lebanese-Danish DJ, songwriter and record producer. He is co-founder of the Danish Kashcow record label.

Darwich & Garcia
Darwich closely collaborated with Thomas Høgsted between 1999 and 2004 as a dance music producing duo Darwich & Garcia producing various successful acts like Danish girl duo Creamy (whose debut album was certified four times platinum), Catch, Das Saint, Mardia, Mirah, Smile.dk, Tiggy, B Sides, JJ Spencer, Ivy D., Covergirl, Ice, Sisse, and Razz, the 2002 winner of Junior Melodi Grand Prix with the song "Kickflipper".

Under the name B-Sides, a trio collaboration with Thomas Høgsted and Lasse Thomsen, he released the single "Respect Your DJ"

Pad
During the same period, he was part of Pad (Panman, Ace45 and Darwich) with Ace 45 being Morten Erikson and Panman being Jeppe Budolfsen. In 2001 Pad produced Mardia's "Knock Knock Knocking".

Other production and songwriting works
In 2008 he collaborated with DJ Kato in "Copa Cabana (Whine Your Body)" featuring Mission. He went on to produce and co-write Kato's Discolized that reached number 6 in Tracklisten the Danish Albums Chart and follow-up Discolized 2.0 that topped the chart. Darwich and Kato also cooperated with Jeremy Carr.

Under the alias N'Joy, he has appeared in a number of compilation albums like Giga Hits Summer Lato 2002, Giga Hits Zima 2003, Millenium Disco 2010 and as N'Joy was featured in Aycan track "Devil in Disguise" in the compilation album DJ Sampler Denmark from TMC - The Music Company.

"I'm No Latino" a hit for Dutch pop and dance singer EliZe.

Kashcow
Co-founding Kashcow, he signed many artists to the label including Chrelle, Chriz, JesperZar, Kelde, Ridser I Lakken, Jack Rowan, Michael Rune and groups Daze, Aycan. The label has also released works for Nadia Gattas, Cecilie Fleur and Tønnov.

has released a number of singles featuring artists like Kato, Linda Andrews, Inez, Anna David, Nile and Lyck. He has also written and produced songs for Michael Rune, and groups Daze amongst others.

Awards and nominations
In 2011, he was nominated for Best Danish DJ and nine other categories during the Danish DeeJay Awards.

Discography
Charting

Other releases 
Darwich
2010: Kato - Discolized (album production)
2011: Kato - Discolized 2.0 (album production)

Darwich & Garcia 
(production and songwriting duo Ahmad Darwich and Thomas Høgsted)
1999: Creamy Den Bedste Jul I 2000 År (EP single)
1999: Creamy - Creamy
2000: Creamy - "Little Kitty" (single)
2000: Smile.dk – Future Girls (album)
2002: Razz - "Kickflipper" (single)
2002: Razz - Kickflipper (album)
2003: Ivy D. – "Stop That Time" (single)
2003: Covergirl - "Believe" (single)
2004: JJ Spencer – "Better Safe Than Sorry" (single)
2004: Ice – "Singin' Dam Di Da Doo" (single)

B-Sides
(production trio Ahmad Darwich, Thomas Høgsted and Lasse Thomsen)
2001: "Respect Your DJ"
Kashcow
as Darwich (DJ)
2008: Kato & Darwich feat. Mission - "Copa Cabana (Whine Your Body)"
2010: Darwich feat. Linda Andrews - "Det bedste til sidst"
2011: Darwich feat. Inez - "Puls" 	
2012: Darwich feat. Anna David - "Solstorm" 
2013: Darwich feat. Niel - "Go! (Ba Ba Ba)" 
2013: Darwich feat Lyck - "Tusind År"
Others
2011: Aycan -	"Easy Come Easy Go"
2011: Michael Rune feat. Nadia Gattas	- "Min indre stemme"
2012: Michael Rune feat. Cecilie Fleur - "Væk i natten"
2012: Daze - "Fool Me!"
2012: Kelde - "One More Night"
2013: Jack Rowan feat Sam Gray - "Invincible"
2013: Kelde feat. Mona Lisa - "Get on the Floor"
2013: Tönnov - "We Are Always Looking Hot"
2013: Tönnov - "Turn It Up!"
2013: No Requests - "I'm a DJ Not a Jukebox"

featured in as N'Joy
2010: "Devil in Disguise" (Aycan featuring N'Joy)

References

External links
Discogs.com: Ahmad Darwich -- Darwich & Garcia -- N'Joy
Kashcow Record label website

Danish DJs
Danish record producers
Danish songwriters
1977 births
Living people
Electronic dance music DJs